The Gouged stronghold is located in the city of Gouged, in the Golpayegan county, in Iran. The city Gouged is located 5 km to the north of Golpayegan. In peacetime, the stronghold was used as a caravansary, but during the war time or when the bandits attacked, it was used as a castle. This structure is located in the Golpayegani alley and Ghale alley. At present, the stronghold is used as a traditional three star hotel.

The Gouged stronghold is one of the biggest adobe and mud structure in Iran. It was built approximately 400 years ago. The only document related to this structure dates back to 140 years ago. By this document, Ali Khan Bakhtiari gave half of the stronghold to his wife as mahr.

See also 
 List of the historical structures in the Isfahan province

References

Gallery 

Castles in Iran
National works of Iran
Qajar castles